The 2012 Visit Panamá Cup was a professional tennis tournament played on clay courts. It was the first edition of the tournament which was part of the 2012 ATP Challenger Tour. It took place in Panama City, Panama between 2 and 8 July 2012.

Singles main draw entrants

Seeds

 1 Rankings are as of June 25, 2012.

Other entrants
The following players received wildcards into the singles main draw:
  Walner Espinoza
  William Karlberg
  Gonzalo Lama
  Nicolás Massú

The following players received entry from the qualifying draw:
  Luca Margaroli
  Phillip Simmonds
  Felipe Escobar
  Christian Ignacio Benedetti

Champions

Singles

 Rogério Dutra da Silva def.  Peter Polansky, 6–3, 6–0

Doubles

 Júlio César Campozano /  Alejandro González def.  Daniel Kosakowski /  Peter Polansky, 6–4, 7–5

External links
Official website

Visit Panama Cup
Visit Panamá Cup

it:Visit Panama Cup